Cephalozia is a genus of liverworts belonging to the family Cephaloziaceae.

The genus was first described by Barthélemy Charles Joseph du Mortier.

The genus has cosmopolitan distribution.

Species:
 Cephalozia catenulata (Huebener) Lindb.
 Cephalozia connivens (Dicks.) Lindb.

References

Cephaloziaceae
Jungermanniales genera